Zeng Xisheng (October 11, 1904 – July 15, 1968) was a Chinese politician. He was born in Xingning, Hunan Province (now Zixing, Hunan Province). He was the first Chinese Communist Party Committee Secretary of Anhui Province and also its 1st governor after the founding of the People's Republic of China. He was the 5th Communist Party Secretary of Shandong Province.

Zeng was a proponent of the Great Leap Forward, but as Anhui became one of the first provinces to sink into famine, Zeng in 1961 allowed for farmers to rent land for private use, like growing crops. The land was recollectivized in the following years. In 1962 he was criticized during Seven Thousand Cadres Conference and replaced by Li Baohua and transferred out of Anhui to take on the office of Second Secretary of the Southeast Bureau. He died in 1968 during the Cultural Revolution, as his prior actions had been considered anti-revolutionary.

References

1904 births
1968 deaths
People's Republic of China politicians from Hunan
Chinese Communist Party politicians from Hunan
Governors of Anhui
Political office-holders in Anhui
Political office-holders in Shandong
Politicians from Chenzhou
People persecuted to death during the Cultural Revolution
Whampoa Military Academy alumni